The following are international rankings of Indonesia.

General
 Indonesia ranked 83 out of 169, Good Country Index 2022.
 Indonesia hosts 8 UNESCO's World Heritage Sites and holds 6 items UNESCO's Intangible Cultural Heritage.
 Freedom in the World: partly free (2021).

Agriculture

 Indonesia was the largest producer of cinnamon (2020).
 Indonesia was the largest producer of cloves (2020).
 Indonesia was the largest producer of coconut (2020).
 Indonesia was the largest producer of nutmeg, mace, cardamoms (2020).
 Indonesia was the largest producer of vanilla (2013).
 Indonesia was the second largest producer of banana (2020).
 Indonesia was the second largest producer of non-chicken egg (2020).
 Indonesia was the second largest producer of green beans (2020).
 Indonesia was the second largest producer of mango, mangosteen, guava (2020).
 Indonesia was the third largest producer of black pepper (2020).
 Indonesia was the third largest producer of chili pepper (2020).
 Indonesia was the third largest producer of cocoa (2020).
 Indonesia was the third largest producer of rice production (2013).
 Indonesia was the fourth largest producer of abaca (2020).
 Indonesia was the fourth largest producer of coffee (2020).
 Indonesia was the fourth largest producer of chicken egg (2020).
 Indonesia was the fourth largest producer of pineapple (2020).
 Indonesia was the fourth largest producer of tobacco (2020).
 Indonesia was the fifth largest producer of avocado (2020).
 Indonesia was the fifth largest producer of eggplant (2020).
 Indonesia was the fifth largest producer of ginger (2020).
 Indonesia was the fifth largest producer of papaya (2020).

Cities
 Bandung ranked 114 out of 120 (Global City Competitiveness Index, 2012).
 Jakarta ranked 20 out of 74 among cities proper by population.
 Jakarta: Alpha-rank Global city (2012).
 Jakarta ranked 51 out of 84 (Global Cities Index, 2014).
 Jakarta ranked 81 out of 120  (Global City Competitiveness Index, 2012).
 Pekalongan listed as UNESCO Cities of Crafts and Folk Art (2014).
 Surabaya: Sufficiency-rank Global city (2012).
 Surabaya ranked 110 out of 120 (Global City Competitiveness Index, 2012).

Demographics

 Social Progress Index: ranked 94 of 168 (2021).
 Composite Index of National Capability: ranked 14 (score: 0.013708) (2007).
 Christianity by country: ranked 25 in total Christian population (25 million - 10% of the population).
 Ethnic diversity rank: 24 out of 159 countries (2003).
 Foundation of well-being: ranked 67 (2015).
 Global Innovation Index: 75 out of 132 (2022).
 Index of Globalization 2010, ranked 86 out of 181 countries.
 Hinduism by country: ranked 4 in total Hindu population. 
 Hinduism by country: ranked 24 by the percentage of population.
 International Innovation Index: 71 out of 110 (2009).
 Islam by country: ranked 1 in total Muslim population.
 Islam by country: ranked 35 by the percentage of population.
 Life expectancy estimated by CIA World Factbook, ranked 149 out of 227 (2022). 
 Linguistic diversity index of Indonesia: 0.816 (2017). 
 Population of Indonesia ranked 4 out of 228 countries and territories (2022). 
 Population density: 87 out of 248 (2021).
 Social Progress Index: ranked 86 (2015).

Economic

 Bribe Payers Index: 25 out of 28 main exporting countries.
 Current account balance deficit: ranked 7 (2019).
 Ease of doing business index: 73 out of 190 (2020).
 Exports: 30 out of 204 (2015).
 Global Corruption Barometer: 65 out of (collectively) 95 (2013).
 Global Services Location Index (2009): 5 out of 50 countries.
 Index of Economic Freedom: 63 out of 177 (2022).
 International Property Rights Index: 67 out of 129 countries (2022).
Nominal GDP ranked 17 by IMF (2022); ranked 16 by World Bank (2021); ranked 16 by United Nations (2020).
Nominal GDP per capita ranked 113 by IMF (2022); ranked 113 by World Bank (2021); ranked 114 by United Nations (2020).
 World Competitiveness Yearbook: 44 out of 63 (2022).
United Nations: Human Development Index (HDI): 114 out of 191 countries (2022).

Education

 Education Index scored 0.65 (2019)
 Literacy rate: 96.0% (2020).
 EF English Proficiency Index: 81 out of 111 countries - low proficiency (2022).

Environment

 Natural disaster risk: 136 out of 171 (2016).
 Yale University Center for Environmental Law and Policy and Columbia University Center for International Earth Science Information Network: Environmental Performance Index, ranked 164 out of 180 countries (2022).

Geography

 Total area Indonesia is the 15th largest out of 249 territories.
 Largest archipelagic state in the world by area and population
 Largest island country in the world: 17,508 islands
 Java Island is the most populated island in the world, 148,7 million people (2021).

Military

 Center for Strategic and International Studies: active troops ranked 17 out of 180 countries.
 Global Militarization Index: 98 out of 151 countries (2013).
 Number of warships: ranked 14 out 55 listed countries.
 UN peacekeepers: ranked 16 out of 128 countries (2014).
 World's largest arms importers: ranked 5 (2013).

Political

 Transparency International: Corruption Perceptions Index, ranked 96 out of 180 countries (2021).
 Reporters without borders: Worldwide press freedom index, ranked 146 of 179 territories.
 The Economist Democracy Index: 52 out of 167 countries (2021).
 Global Peace Index: 47 out of 163 countries (2022).
 Global Terrorism Index: 24 out of 124 (score: 5.500) (2022).

Society

 World Economic Forum: Global Gender Gap Report 2022 scored 0.697
 World Health Organization: suicide rate, ranked 171 out of 178 (2019).
 University of Leicester Satisfaction with Life Index 2006, ranked 69 out of 178 countries
 World Giving Index: ranked 1 out of 157 countries- very generous (2021).
 World Happiness Report: ranked 87 out of 146 countries (2022).
 Happy Planet Index: 14 out of 111 countries (2012).

Sport
 FIFA World Rankings: Men's team ranked highest was 76th in September 1998.
 FIFA World Rankings: Women's team ranked highest was 58th in October 2003.

Technology
 Fixed-broadband subscriptions, ranked 25 out of 166. (2017)
 Mobile-cellular subscriptions, ranked 3 out of 172. (2017)
 Number of mobile phones in use ranked 3 out of 79 (2016).
 Economist Intelligence Unit: E-readiness 2008, ranked 68 out of 70 countries
 World Economic Forum: Global Information Technology Report (GITR) 2011: ranked 53 out of 138 countries.

Tourism

 World Tourism Organization: World Tourism rankings 2007, ranked 37 out of 200 Countries.
 International arrival of foreign tourists to Indonesia ranked 10 in the Asia and the Pacific (2019).

See also
 Lists of countries
 Lists by country
 List of international rankings

References

Indonesia